Insaaf: The Justice is a 2004 Hindi Drama film directed by Shrey Shrivastav and produced by Mohammed Fasih. The film features Dino Morea, Sanjay Suri and Namrata Shirodkar as main characters and Rajpal Yadav in a supporting role.

Plot
Vishwanath Prasad is an Indian Administrative Service officer and lives in Bombay with his wife, Kunti, and a daughter, Sanaa. One night when he returns home, his wife tells him that she has been sexually assaulted and names the culprit as one Bunty. Vishwanath is angered at this outrage and speaks to a senior police officer, who initially offers all help to prosecute Bunty. But when the senior police officer finds out that Bunty is really Narendra Verma, the son of Home Minister Rameshwari, he backs off and tells Vishwanath he cannot do anything. Vishwanath then goes to the nearest police station to lodge a F.I.R. (First Information Report), however, Police Inspector Brij Bhushan refuses to write it. When the Governor refuses to meet with him, he telephones the State Chief Minister Chandramohan, who invites him to his house the very next day. The next at the Chief Minister's residence, he finds Rameshwari and Bunty also present there. Chandramohan asks Bunty to apologize, but Vishwanath is not satisfied as he wants Bunty to be criminally prosecuted. Then Bunty's goons take over and start terrorizing Vishwanath and his family. Frustrated, Vishwanath kills himself. His suicide case is turned over to the Central Bureau of Investigation and assigned to Officers Pradhan and Abhimanyu Singh. Shortly thereafter, Bunty and Rameshwari are arrested, charged and the matter is brought to court. The court dismisses the case and Bunty and his mom are set free. Subsequently, Abhimanyu's girlfriend, Reena, gets more evidence, the case is re-opened and a warrant issued for Bunty and his mom's arrest. It is here that the young and naive Abhimanyu will find how hard it is for justice to prevail especially when the suspect is the son of an influential Home Minister, and that politics does rule above everything else.

Cast
 Dino Morea as IPS officer Abhimanyu Singh
 Sanjay Suri as IAS Officer Vishwanath Prasad
 Namrata Shirodkar as Mrs. Kunti Vishwanath Prasad
 Henna as Reena
 Rajpal Yadav as Kailu
 Tej Sapru as Inspector Brij Bhushan
 Mohan Joshi as CBI Officer Pradhan
 Shri Vallabh Vyas as Chief Minister Chandramohan
 Varun Vardhan as Yogi, Social Worker
 Dayal Shankra as Narendra 'Bunty' Verma
 Kunika as Minister Rameshwari Verma
 Amitabh Bachchan as Narrator

Music

The music of the film was composed by Nikhil-Vinay and the lyrics were penned by Sameer.

Reception
Taran Adarsh of  IndiaFM gave the film 1 out of 5, writing ″On the whole, INSAAF - THE JUSTICE is a complete letdown. At the box-office, it just won't work!″  Sukanya Verma of  Rediff.com wrote ″The first half of Insaaf is tense, while the second is full of boring songs picturised in pretty locations. If the film's intention is to preach, it backfires. If it wishes to bring about an awakening, it fails.″ Manish Gajjar of  BBC.com wrote ″the film lacks originality. It's yet another Bollywood film where the lead star takes the law into her hands to seek revenge. The whole film is predictable. We know what's going to happen next. In addition, the rape scene - at about five minutes - goes on way longer than necessary. A scene a fraction of the length would have provided the necessary impact.

References

External links

2000s Hindi-language films
2004 films
Films scored by Nikhil-Vinay
Films about rape in India